Cockermouth School is a coeducational secondary school and sixth form located in Cockermouth in the English county of Cumbria.

Previously a community school administered by Cumbria County Council, Cockermouth School converted to academy status in September 2015. However the school continues to coordinate with Cumbria County Council for admissions.

History
In 1984, Derwent School and Cockermouth Grammar School merged to become Cockermouth School, a comprehensive school operating on two sites. In 1991, the former Derwent School site was expanded to accommodate all students.

Programmes of Study
Cockermouth School offers GCSEs and BTECs as programmes of study for pupils, while students in the sixth form have the option to study from a range of A-levels and further BTECs.

We Will initiative
The school is co-operating and following the advice given by the students in the 'We Will' initiative. These were youngsters who were failed by the local CAMHS services, who gathered together in 2018, researched the issues and started lobbying to have them addressed.

Notable former pupils
 Luke Greenbank, swimmer
 Ven Catherine Pickford, Archdeacon of Northolt
 Ben Stokes, cricketer
 James Trafford, professional footballer

Cockermouth Grammar School
 Christine Alderson, film producer
 Sir David Carter (surgeon), Chief Medical Officer for Scotland from 1996-2000
 Neil Mercer, Professor of Education at the University of Cambridge
 Judith Stamper, television presenter from 1985-95 of Look North

References

External links
Cockermouth School official website 
We Will official website

Secondary schools in Cumbria
Academies in Cumbria
Cockermouth